Mad Max: Original Motion Picture Soundtrack is a soundtrack album for the 1979 film, Mad Max, composed by Brian May. It was released on vinyl in the United States in 1980 by Varèse Sarabande, followed by a CD release on 26 October 1993.

Overview 
Composer Brian May won the assignment of composing the music for Mad Max. " when director George Miller and producer Byron Kennedy met at director Richard Franklin house for dinner one evening and played two of May's score for his then-upcoming film Patrick (1978). At the time, both directors and the producer were looking for a score that resembled the works of Bernard Herrmann and specifically what Bernard Herrmann and Co. did in Hitchcock films," In his own words; "because they had a big action movie and they needed a score to propel it along and give it a lot of bite and energy.

Combining classical orchestration with mechanical sounds, May's work on Mad Max is notable for its distinctive soundscape that interacts with the film's diegetic sounds. "Mad Max was a strongly energized score in the violence/action department, and for that they wanted a totally non-melodic score," explained May. "It was very jagged and shearing, and George particularly wanted me to antagonize the audience by making them feel uncomfortable. Sometimes we had jagged notes going against dialog so that the audience would feel frustrated." Such effects were developed through the application of stingers by way of brass and percussion instruments.

May went on to win the Australian Film Award for Best Original Score for his work on Mad Max.

Reception 

The musical score for Mad Max has received generally positive reviews. Quentin Billard of GoldenScore called it "one of the most impressive symphonic scores of Brian May", adding, "The darkness and brutality of his music for the film [...] accentuates the constant unease throughout the film."

In a retrospective review, Paul Andrew MacLean of Film Score Monthly wrote, "May's score lent incalculable scope to the film, making it larger and more furious. Coupled with furiously staccato writing and Stravinskian time signatures, the result was a strident, metallic score, perfectly underscoring the film's barbarous, high-velocity car culture." Chris McEneany, writing for AVForms, similarly praised the soundtrack, describing it as "often harsh, wild and blood-curdling". He later added, "Far more narratively structured than the two scores that followed in the Mad Max Trilogy, but no less violent, ballsy, headlong and rubber-burning, this is a classic thriller score from an era that was the change."

Track listing

Personnel 
 Production

 Brian May – composer, conductor
 Chris Kuchler – executive producer
 Tom Null – executive producer
 Scot Holton – producer (Varèse Sarabande)

 John Acoca – editor, preparation
 Roger Savage – recording engineer
 Richard Simpson – mastering engineer
 Rick Goldman – plating

Additional music 
Additional music featured in Mad Max:

References 

Mad Max music
1980 soundtrack albums
Varèse Sarabande soundtracks
1980s film soundtrack albums